Derrick Mehmen (born May 30, 1985) is an American professional mixed martial artist currently competing in the Heavyweight division for the Titan Fighting Championships. A professional competitor since 2006, Mehmen has also made appearances in Strikeforce, Bellator, and World Series of Fighting.

Background
Mehmen was a two-time conference high school wrestling champion for Denver High School in his hometown of Denver, Iowa, placing fourth in the state meet as a junior. He later became an NJCAA All-American at Ellsworth Community College, placing fifth in the 2007 national meet before transferring to the University of Iowa, where he continued to compete in collegiate wrestling after originally signing a letter of intent to compete for South Dakota State University. Mehmen majored in communication studies.

Mixed martial arts career

Bellator MMA
Mehmen made his Bellator debut against David Branch and lost via submission in the second round.

Strikeforce
Mehmen made his Strikeforce debut against Roy Jones and won via unanimous decision. He next fought Gian Villante at Strikeforce: Barnett vs. Cormier and lost via unanimous decision.

World Series of Fighting
On June 17, 2013 it was announced that Mehmen signed a contract with World Series of Fighting where Mehmen has competed as a Heavyweight.

Mehmen fought Rolles Gracie Jr. in a Heavyweight bout on September 14, 2013 at World Series of Fighting 5: Arlovski vs. Kyle Mehmen won the bout with a one punch knockout in the second round.

Mehmen fought against Scott Barrett at World Series of Fighting 8: Gaethje vs. Patishnock on January 18, 2014. Mehmen won the bout via unanimous decision.

Mehmen faced Dave Huckaba at World Series of Fighting 10: Branch vs. Taylor on June 21, 2014. He won the fight via unanimous decision.

Mehmen faced Smealinho Rama for the inaugural WSOF Heavyweight Championship at World Series of Fighting 14: Ford vs. Shields on October 11, 2014. He lost the fight via TKO in the first round.

Mehmen challenged Blagoy Ivanov for the WSOF Heavyweight Championship at World Series of Fighting 24: Fitch vs. Okami on October 17, 2015. He lost the fight via TKO in the second round.

Personal life
Mehmen is married and has a daughter. divorced and has a second daughter

Championships and accomplishments
Inside MMA
Bazzie Award for KO Punch of the Year (2013) vs. Rolles Gracie, Jr.

Mixed martial arts record

|-
| Loss
| align=center| 19–10
| Mikhail Mokhnatkin
| Decision (unanimous)
| Fight Nights Global 75: Deák vs. Chistyakov
| 
| align=center| 3
| align=center| 5:00
| Saint Petersburg, Russia
|
|-
| Loss
| align=center| 19–9
| Alexei Kudin
| Decision (split)
| Fight Nights Global 64: Nam vs. Bagautinov
| 
| align=center| 3
| align=center| 5:00
| Moscow, Russia
|
|-
| Loss
| align=center| 19–8
| D.J. Linderman
| Decision (unanimous)
| Titan FC 40
| 
| align=center| 3
| align=center| 5:00
| Coral Gables, Florida, United States
|
|-
| Loss
| align=center| 19–7
| Blagoy Ivanov
| TKO (punches)
| WSOF 24
| 
| align=center| 2
| align=center| 4:33
| Mashantucket, Connecticut, United States
| 
|-
| Win
| align=center| 19–6
| Brett Rogers
| Decision (unanimous)
| Abu Dhabi Warriors 2
| 
| align=center| 3
| align=center| 5:00
| Abu Dhabi, United Arab Emirates
| 
|-
| Loss
| align=center| 18–6
| Smealinho Rama
| TKO (punches)
| WSOF 14
| 
| align=center| 1
| align=center| 0:51
| Edmonton, Alberta, Canada
| 
|-
| Win
| align=center| 18–5
| Dave Huckaba
| Decision (unanimous)
| WSOF 10
| 
| align=center| 3
| align=center| 5:00
| Las Vegas, Nevada, United States
| 
|-
| Win
| align=center| 17–5
| Scott Barrett
| Decision (unanimous)
| WSOF 8
| 
| align=center| 3
| align=center| 5:00
| Hollywood, Florida, United States
| 
|-
| Win
| align=center| 16–5
| Rolles Gracie, Jr.
| KO (punch)
| WSOF 5
| 
| align=center| 2
| align=center| 2:40
| Atlantic City, New Jersey, United States
| 
|-
| Win
| align=center| 15–5
| Louis DeWerdt
| Decision (unanimous)
| Pinnacle Combat 13
| 
| align=center| 3
| align=center| 5:00
| Dubuque, Iowa, United States
| 
|-
| Win
| align=center| 14–5
| Patrick Harman
| Submission (rear-naked choke)
| Pinnacle Combat 11
| 
| align=center| 1
| align=center| 4:20
| Dubuque, Iowa, United States
| 
|-
| Win
| align=center| 13–5
| John Reed
| TKO (punches)
| Iowa Challenge 71
| 
| align=center| 1
| align=center| 1:12
| Cedar Rapids, Iowa, United States
| 
|-
| Loss
| align=center| 12–5
| Gian Villante
| Decision (unanimous)
| Strikeforce: Barnett vs. Cormier
| 
| align=center| 3
| align=center| 5:00
| San Jose, California, United States
| 
|-
| Loss
| align=center| 12–4
| Rodney Wallace
| Decision (unanimous)
| WMMA 1: Fighting for a Better World
| 
| align=center| 3
| align=center| 5:00
| El Paso, Texas, United States
| 
|-
| Win
| align=center| 12–3
| Roy Jones
| Decision (unanimous)
| Strikeforce Challengers: Gurgel vs. Duarte
| 
| align=center| 3
| align=center| 5:00
| Las Vegas, Nevada, United States
| 
|-
| Win
| align=center| 11–3
| Matt Thompson
| Decision (unanimous)
| Fight Time 4: MMA Heavyweight Explosion
| 
| align=center| 3
| align=center| 5:00
| Fort Lauderdale, Florida, United States
| 
|-
| Loss
| align=center| 10–3
| Gareth Joseph
| Decision (split)
| World Extreme Fighting 45
| 
| align=center| 3
| align=center| 5:00
| Jacksonville, Florida, United States
| 
|-
| Win
| align=center| 10–2
| Chase Waldon
| TKO (punches)
| Brutaal: Fight Night
| 
| align=center| 1
| align=center| 1:14
| Red Wing, Minnesota, United States
| 
|-
| Win
| align=center| 9–2
| Demetrius Richards
| TKO (punches)
| The Cage Inc: Battle at the Border 5
| 
| align=center| 1
| align=center| 4:09
| Hankinson, North Dakota, United States
| 
|-
| Loss
| align=center| 8–2
| David Branch
| Submission (rear-naked choke)
| Bellator 15
| 
| align=center| 2
| align=center| 0:26
| Uncasville, Connecticut, United States
| Catchweight of 190 lbs.
|-
| Win
| align=center| 8–1
| Eric Poling
| TKO (punches)
| Soldiers of Fortune 1
| 
| align=center| 1
| align=center| 2:50
| Coralville, Iowa, United States
| 
|-
| Win
| align=center| 7–1
| Todd Monaghan
| TKO (punches)
| Mainstream MMA: Mehmen vs. Monaghan 
| 
| align=center| 1
| align=center| 1:33
| Dubuque, Iowa, United States
| 
|-
| Win
| align=center| 6–1
| Kyle Davis
| Submission (choke)
| Brutaal Fight Night: David and Goliath
| 
| align=center| 3
| align=center| 0:42
| Ames, Iowa, United States
| 
|-
| Win
| align=center| 5–1
| Lamar Coleman
| TKO (punches)
| Brutaal Fight Night: March Badness
| 
| align=center| 1
| align=center| 2:00
| Maplewood, Minnesota, United States
| 
|-
| Loss
| align=center| 4–1
| Mike Ciesnolevicz
| Submission (guillotine choke)
| Adrenaline MMA 2: Miletich vs. Denny
| 
| align=center| 1
| align=center| 1:46
| Moline, Illinois, United States
| 
|-
| Win
| align=center| 4–0
| Karl Kelly
| TKO (punches)
| Mainstream MMA 10: Reloaded
| 
| align=center| 1
| align=center| N/A
| Dubuque, Iowa, United States
| 
|-
| Win
| align=center| 3–0
| Rashad Brooks
| TKO (punches)
| Mainstream MMA 9: New Era
| 
| align=center| 1
| align=center| N/A
| Cedar Rapids, Iowa, United States
| 
|-
| Win
| align=center| 2–0
| Pete Staranko
| TKO (punches)
| Mainstream MMA 5: Heavy Duty
| 
| align=center| 1
| align=center| N/A
| Cedar Rapids, Iowa, United States
| 
|-
| Win
| align=center| 1–0
| Jeremy Norwood
| TKO (punches)
| Iowa Challenge 30
| 
| align=center| 2
| align=center| 0:53
| Waterloo, Iowa, United States
|

References

External links
 

Living people
1985 births
American male mixed martial artists
Light heavyweight mixed martial artists
Heavyweight mixed martial artists
Mixed martial artists utilizing collegiate wrestling
Mixed martial artists from Iowa
American male sport wrestlers
Amateur wrestlers